Konina may refer to:

Konina, Mali
 Konina, Limanowa County, Poland